A list of films produced in the Cinema of Austria in the 1960s ordered by year of release. For an alphabetical list of articles on Austrian films see :Category:Austrian films. Due to a sharp decline in Austrian film production, the rate of films released reached very low numbers by the end of the decade, with most of these being international co-productions with partial Austrian participation.

1960

1961

1962

1963

1964

1965

1966

1967

1968

1969

References

Bibliography 
 Von Dassanowsky, Robert. Austrian Cinema: A History. McFarland, 2005.

External links
 Austrian film at the Internet Movie Database
http://www.austrianfilm.com/

1960s
Austrian
Films